The Maskerchugg River is a river in the U.S. state of Rhode Island. It flows approximately 6 km (4 mi). There are four dams along the river's length.

Course
The river rises from an unnamed pond in Warwick near the intersection of Cowesett Road and Paddock Drive. From there, the river flows east along Cowesett Road, then turns southeast and flows past Interstate 95 to East Greenwich. The river then continues to its mouth at Greenwich Cove, on the north side of Potowomut Peninsula.

Crossings
Below is a list of all crossings over the Maskerchugg River. The list starts at the headwaters and goes downstream.
Warwick
Cowesett Road (Twice)
Interstate 95
East Greenwich
Division Street (RI 401)
Sylvan Drive
Green Hill Way
Kenyon Avenue
Main Street (U.S. 1)

Tributaries
Dark Entry Brook is the Maskerchugg River's only named tributary, though it has many unnamed streams that also feed it.

See also
List of rivers in Rhode Island

References
Maps from the United States Geological Survey

Rivers of Kent County, Rhode Island
Warwick, Rhode Island
East Greenwich, Rhode Island
Rivers of Rhode Island